Chopoqlu (also Romanized as Chopoqlū, Chepeqlū, and Çopoqlu; also known as Choboqlū, Chopoghloo, Saboklū, and Sabūqalū) is a village in Pish Khowr Rural District, Pish Khowr District, Famenin County, Hamadan Province, Iran. At the 2006 census, its population was 254, in 71 families.

References 

Populated places in Famenin County